Cortinarius collinitus is a species of fungi in the family Cortinariaceae.

Description
The cap is 3–9 cm in diameter, convex to flat in shape, with a sticky, gelatinous surface (in moist conditions). The gills are adnexed, close, and pallid or pale violet in color. The stipe is typically 6–12 cm long and 1–1.5 cm thick, solid, equal, and has transverse scaly-looking bands. The spore print, like most Cortiniarius species, is rusty-brown. The edibility for this species was unknown, but it is now considered inedible.

See also
List of Cortinarius species

References

External links
Medicinal Mushrooms description and medicinal properties
Roger's Mushrooms description

collinitus
Fungi of Europe
Fungi of North America
Fungi described in 1838
Inedible fungi